Ximei is a 2019 American documentary directed by Andy Cohen, co-directed by Gaylen Ross and produced by Ai Weiwei.  In a gritty, vérité style, the film follows the harrowing crusades of a peasant woman named Liu Ximei.  She fights for the survival of fellow AIDS victims who contracted AIDS in the 1990s when Chinese health officials encouraged millions of poor farmers to sell their blood for a pittance under catastrophic health conditions.

Production of Ximei lasted seven years, due to interference from Chinese officials; Cohen's phone and internet messages were spied on, parts of the footage regularly confiscated, and he and Ross were expelled from the AIDS villages on various occasions.  Subjects of the film were often detained by the authorities and forced to sign statements and the film's Chinese cameraman was arrested and later released for his activism.

Reception 

The LA Times’ Kimber Myers observed, "No wonder China was so concerned about the production of Ximei…But this isn’t simply a damning indictment of the nation; it is a hopeful celebration of one woman’s activism and kindness in the face of her own struggle with AIDS."

In the opinion of Ben Kenigsberg of the NY Times, "It does pay its subjects the ultimate courtesy, treating them as officials have not: as fully rounded human beings."

Joe Bendel wrote, "Cohen & Ross’s Ximei (executive produced by Ai Weiwei) is very highly recommended as a profile in courage and an indictment of the CCP’s callous contempt for human life."

In Spiritual Practice Micah Bucey states, "Ximei, directed with a combination of in-the-moment grit and great sensitivity by Andrew Cohen and Gaylen Ross, follows this no-nonsense justice warrior through her often mundane days."

Awards 

 Close Up Edinburgh Docufest – Best social impact Doc
 Movies that Matters – Golden Butterfly Award
 The Telly Awards – Silver Telly Award
 Golden Gate International Film Festival – Film of the Festival 
 Golden Gate International Film Festival – Best Cinematography

References

External links 
 
 

2019 films
2019 documentary films
Documentary films about China
Documentary films about HIV/AIDS
HIV/AIDS in American films
American documentary films
2010s American films